Xiong Yan (died 828 BC) was from 837 to 828 BC the 11th viscount of the state of Chu during the Western Zhou Dynasty of ancient China.  Like other early Chu rulers, he held the hereditary noble rank of viscount first granted to his ancestor Xiong Yi by King Cheng of Zhou.

Xiong Yan's father was also named Xiong Yan (熊延, different in Chinese characters), who was succeeded as the ruler of Chu by his older son Xiong Yong.  Xiong Yong died in 838 BC and the younger Xiong Yan succeeded his older brother.

Xiong Yan had four sons: Xiong Shuang, Xiong Xue, Xiong Kan, and Xiong Xun.  When Xiong Yan died in 828 BC he was succeeded by his first son Xiong Shuang.  However, when Xiong Shuang died six years later, Xiong Yan's three younger sons fought one another for the throne.  The youngest son Xiong Xun was ultimately victorious and ascended the throne, while Xiong Xue was killed and Xiong Kan escaped to Pu.

References

Monarchs of Chu (state)
9th-century BC Chinese monarchs
828 BC deaths
Year of birth unknown